The Very Best of Chris Rea is the third compilation album by the British singer-songwriter Chris Rea, released in 2001. The last track, "Saudade", was originally written and recorded in 1994 as a tribute to the Formula 1 racing driver Ayrton Senna who died in a crash at Imola on 1 May that year. In Portuguese, the word saudade roughly means the feeling, emotions and euphoria of a certain moment in time. It reached #69 position in the UK album charts, and was certified Gold by the BPI in 2004.

Track listing
 "The Road to Hell (Part 2)" - 4:32
 "Fool (If You Think It's Over)" - 4:05
 "Let's Dance" - 4:15
 "You Can Go Your Own Way" - 3:56
 "Julia" - 3:55
 "Stainsby Girls" - 4:08
 "Tell Me There's a Heaven" - 6:02
 "Josephine" - 3:36
 "Steel River" - 6:11
 "On the Beach" - 6:50
 "I Can Hear Your Heartbeat" - 3:23
 "All Summer Long" - 3:33
 "The Blue Cafe" - 4:47
 "Auberge" - 4:44
 "Driving Home for Christmas" - 4:01
 "Nothing to Fear" - 4:30
 "Saudade, Pt. 1 and 2" - 6:49

Certifications

References

2001 greatest hits albums
Chris Rea compilation albums
East West Records compilation albums